Nadezhda Stasova (1822–1895) was a Russian philanthropist and feminist. She worked to give Russian women greater access to education. A notable philanthropist, she was also, alongside Anna Filosofova (1837–1912) and Maria Trubnikova (1835–1897), one of the pioneer founders and leaders of the first organised Russian women's movement.

In 1863, Stasova, Trubnikova and Anna Engelhardt founded the first Russian Women's Publishing Cooperative. In 1870 she promoted the creation of the Vladimir courses, and became the first director of the Bestuzhev Courses. She helped create the Children's Aid Society in St. Petersburg, served as president of the Russian Women's Mutual Philanthropic Society, and chair of the Society for Assistance to Graduate Science Courses.

References
 Стасова, Надежда Васильевна // Энциклопедический словарь Брокгауза и Ефрона : в 86 т. (82 т. и 4 доп.). — СПб., 1890—1907.

Notes

1822 births
1895 deaths
Feminists from the Russian Empire
Russian women's rights activists
Philanthropists from the Russian Empire
19th-century people from the Russian Empire
Nobility from the Russian Empire
19th-century philanthropists